Prosenik Peak is the peak rising to 2739 m in Doyran Heights, southeast Sentinel Range in Ellsworth Mountains, Antarctica, and surmounting Thomas Glacier to the southeast and Hough Glacier to the east-northeast.

The peak is named after the settlement of Prosenik in Eastern Bulgaria.

Location
US mapping in 1961, updated in 1988.

See also
 Mountains in Antarctica

Maps
 Vinson Massif.  Scale 1:250 000 topographic map.  Reston, Virginia: US Geological Survey, 1988.
 Antarctic Digital Database (ADD). Scale 1:250000 topographic map of Antarctica. Scientific Committee on Antarctic Research (SCAR). Since 1993, regularly updated.

Notes

References
 Prosenik Peak. SCAR Composite Antarctic Gazetteer
 Bulgarian Antarctic Gazetteer. Antarctic Place-names Commission (in Bulgarian)
 Basic data (in English)

External links
 Prosenik Peak. Copernix satellite image

Ellsworth Mountains
Mountains of Ellsworth Land
Bulgaria and the Antarctic